Edwin Hunter Pendleton Arden (February 4, 1864 – October 2, 1918) was an American actor, theatre manager, and playwright.

Biography
Arden was born in St. Louis, Missouri, to Mary Berkley Hunter and Arden Richard Smith. After a common-school education he travelled west and worked in a number of different jobs, including as a mine-helper, cowboy, railroad brakeman, clerk, reporter, and theatre manager.  In 1882, he made his debut as an actor with Thomas W. Keene's Shakespeare company. The next year, he married Keene's daughter Agnes Eagleson Keene.  Their only child, daughter Mildred Arden, also became an actor.  Around this time, he wrote several plays, including The Eagle's Nest, Raglan's Way, Barred Out, and Zorah. 

He worked with a number of theatrical companies over the next thirty years, performing in such works as Edmond Rostand's L'Aiglon,  Victorien Sardou's Fédora, and in an all-star production of Romeo and Juliet at the Knickerbocker Theatre in New York. In his later years, he had his own stock theatre company in Washington, D.C. He starred in silent films such as The Beloved Vagabond (1915).

Partial filmography
 The Exploits of Elaine (1914)
 The New Exploits of Elaine (1915)
 The Beloved Vagabond (1915)
 The Iron Heart (1917)
 Ruling Passions (1918)
 Virtuous Wives (1918)

References
Notes

Bibliography
Johnson, Allen, editor. Dictionary of American Biography (New York: Charles Scribner's Sons, 1964)

Obituary in Baltimore News

External links

19th-century American male actors
American male stage actors
American dramatists and playwrights
Writers from Missouri
Writers from Washington, D.C.
Male actors from St. Louis
Male actors from Chicago
Male actors from Washington, D.C.
1864 births
1918 deaths
Male actors from New York City